The Humanist is an American bi-monthly magazine published in Washington, DC. It was founded in 1941 by American Humanist Association. It covers topics in science, religion, media, technology, politics and popular culture and provides ethical critique and commentary on them. The magazine was originally published under the name of The New Humanist from 1928 to 1940 by a fellowship of American humanists based at the University of Chicago. The magazine has a small circulation, read principally by the three thousand members of the American Humanist Association.

References

Bimonthly magazines published in the United States
Humanist literature
Magazines established in 1941
Magazines published in Washington, D.C.
American Humanist Association